The 1952 Chatham Cup was the 25th annual nationwide knockout football competition in New Zealand.

The competition was run on a regional basis, with regional associations each holding separate qualifying rounds. Teams taking part in the final rounds are known to have included North Shore United (Auckland), Napier High School Old Boys (Hawkes Bay), Pukemiro (Waikato), Mangakino (Bay of Plenty), Wanganui United (Wanganui) Masterton Athletic (Wairarapa), Kiwi United (Manawatu), Seatoun (Wellington), Woodbourne (Marlborough), Western (Christchurch), and Roslyn-Wakari (Dunedin), Runanga (Westland), Brigadiers (Southland).

The 1952 final
The final was dominated by Western; they scored early through Noel Joseph, and it was only the heroics of North Shore keeper Roy Gordon who stopped the Christchurch side going further ahead. With ten minutes left to play Herb Moyle scrambled an equaliser and the match was sent to extra time. The added half-hour was scoreless.

In the days prior to penalty shootouts and replays, tied matches were decided on the number of corners won, and it was only through the last kick of the game that Western gained a corner to level the count. With the score and number of corners equal, it was decided that the trophy would be shared between the two sides. This was the only time this was to happen; replays were introduced to settle tied finals thereafter, with the first replay being played in the 1970 final.

Results

References

Rec.Sport.Soccer Statistics Foundation New Zealand 1952 page

Chatham Cup
Chatham Cup
Chatham Cup
August 1952 sports events in New Zealand